William Jack (July 29, 1788 – February 28, 1852) was a Democratic member of the U.S. House of Representatives from Pennsylvania.

Biography
William Jack was born in Greensburg, Pennsylvania.  He studied law, was admitted to the bar and practiced.  He moved to Brookville, Pennsylvania, in 1831 and engaged in mercantile pursuits.  He was the division inspector of militia for Westmoreland and Fayette Counties from 1830 to 1835.  He served as sheriff of Brookville in 1833, and was a contractor and builder in Mississippi and assisted in the construction of a canal there.  He returned to Pennsylvania and served as a county judge of Jefferson County, Pennsylvania, about 1840.

Jack was elected as a Democrat to the Twenty-seventh Congress.  After his time in Congress, he was engaged in agricultural pursuits.  He returned to Greensburg in 1846 and died there in 1852.  Interment in the Old Cemetery of the St. Clair Cemetery Association.

Sources

The Political Graveyard

1788 births
1852 deaths
Pennsylvania lawyers
Pennsylvania state court judges
Democratic Party members of the United States House of Representatives from Pennsylvania
19th-century American politicians
19th-century American judges
19th-century American lawyers